The Kerguelen petrel (Aphrodroma brevirostris) is a small (36 cm long) slate-grey seabird in the family Procellariidae. It is the only species placed in the  genus Aphrodroma. It is a pelagic, circumpolar seabird of the Southern Ocean. It breeds on islands in the southern Atlantic and Indian Oceans.

Taxonomy
The Kerguelen petrel was formally described in 1831 by the French naturalist René Lesson. He placed it in the genus Procellaria that had been erected for the petrels by Carl Linnaeus in 1758 and coined the binomial name Procellaria brevirostris.
 The Kerguelen petrel was formerly included with the gadfly petrels in the genus Pterodroma but is now placed in the genus Aphrodroma that was introduced for the Kerguelen petrel by Storrs L. Olson in 2000. The name Aphrodroma combines the Ancient Greek aphros meaning "sea foam" with -dromos meaning "-racer".The specific epithet brevirostris is from the Latin brevis meaning "short" and -rostris meaning "-billed". The species is monotypic: no subspecies are recognised.

Breeding
Kerguelen petrels breed colonially on remote islands; colonies are present on Gough Island in the Atlantic Ocean, and Marion Island, Prince Edward Island, Crozet Islands and Kerguelen Island in the Indian Ocean. The species attends its colonies nocturnally, breeding in burrows in wet soil. The burrows usually face away from the prevailing wind. A single egg is laid per breeding season; the egg is unusually round for the family.  The egg is incubated by both parents for 49 days. After hatching the chick fledges after 60 days.

References

External links
 Kerguelen Petrel Photos
 Specimens of the Kerguelen Petrel in the collection of the Museum of New Zealand Te Papa Tongarewa

Kerguelen petrel
Kerguelen petrel
Birds of subantarctic islands
Fauna of the Kerguelen Islands
Fauna of the Crozet Islands
Fauna of Gough Island
Fauna of the Prince Edward Islands
Kerguelen petrel
Taxa named by René Lesson